Chandoo Mondeti is an Indian film director and screenwriter who works in Telugu cinema. He has directed films like Karthikeya (2014), Premam (2016), Bloody Mary (2022), and Karthikeya 2 (2022). For his work on Karthikeya, he was nominated for "Best Director – Telugu" at the 62nd Filmfare Awards South and the 1st IIFA Utsavam awards.

Early Life and Career 
Chandoo Mondeti was born in Vemuluru near Kovvur in Andhra Pradesh. 

He debuted as a director with Karthikeya in 2014. It was a mystery thriller film starring Nikhil Siddhartha and Swathi Reddy in the lead roles. The film revolves showcases the life of a curious medico Karthik who investigates the mystery surrounding a closed Karthikeya temple in the village of Subrahmanyapuram. An incident which happened in Talupulamma Temple in Kakinada district of Andhra Pradesh inspired Chandoo Mondeti to pen the story of Karthikeya.

He then directed Premam (2016), a remake of 2015 Malayalam film of the same name. The film was commercially successful. 

Later he directed Savyasachi (2018) starring Naga Chaitanya and Madhavan (in his Telugu debut) which did not perform well at the box office.  

He later directed the crime drama film Bloody Mary (2022) stars Nivetha Pethuraj, Brahmaji, Ajay, and Kireeti Damaraju. Set in Visakhapatnam, the plot follows three orphaned childhood friends—Mary, Raju, and Basha who find themselves embroiled in a murder case. The film was digitally released on 15 April 2022 on the streaming platform Aha. 

His next project Karthikeya 2, the sequel to Karthikeya, was officially launched in March 2020 in Tirupati with a puja ceremony. Filming took place in India, predominantly in Gujarat and Himachal Pradesh, in addition to Spain, Portugal, and Greece in Europe. It starred Nikhil Siddhartha, Anupama Parameswaran, and Anupam Kher in prominent roles. Karthikeya 2 was released on 13 August 2022 and received positive reviews from critics and became the highest grossing film in Chandoo Mondeti's career.

Filmography

Awards and nominations

References

External links

 

Telugu film directors
Year of birth missing (living people)
Film directors from Andhra Pradesh
People from West Godavari district
21st-century Indian film directors
Living people
Telugu screenwriters
Screenwriters from Andhra Pradesh